Konidela is a gramapanchayat (village) in the Kurnool district (Nandikotkur mandal), Andhra Pradesh, India. Population is approximately 8000 to 8500. Services include Andhra bank, telephone office, Post office, primary and secondary schools.

See also

References

Villages in Kurnool district